Caribbean pipefish (Syngnathus caribbaeus) is a species of pipefish. It is widespread in the Western Atlantic near the coasts of South America from Belize to Suriname, as well as from the Greater and Lesser Antilles. Marine tropical reef-associated fish, up to 22.5 cm length.

References

External links
 Syngnathus caribbaeus at FishBase

Caribbean pipefish
Fish of the Caribbean
Fish of the Dominican Republic
Tropical fish
Taxa named by Charles Eric Dawson
Caribbean pipefish